Bram van der Lek (20 May 1931 – 29 November 2013) was a Dutch politician and author. Representing the Pacifist Socialist Party, he was a member of the House of Representatives from 1967 until 1971 and from 1972 until 1978, the Senate from 1983 until 1984, and the European Parliament from 1984 until 1989. He also wrote a book in 1972,  Het Milieuboekje (The Environment Booklet), which was about environmental issues of the time.

References

1931 births
2013 deaths
People from Delft
Dutch male writers
Pacifist Socialist Party politicians
Pacifist Socialist Party MEPs
MEPs for the Netherlands 1984–1989
Members of the House of Representatives (Netherlands)
Members of the Senate (Netherlands)